Carl Hilding "Doc" Severinsen (born July 7, 1927) is an American retired jazz trumpeter who led the NBC Orchestra on The Tonight Show Starring Johnny Carson.

Early life
Severinsen was born in Arlington, Oregon, to Minnie Mae (1897–1998) and Carl Severinsen (1898–1972). He was nicknamed Doc after his father, the only dentist in Arlington, who was born in Germany to a Danish father and a Swiss mother. Severinsen's father played violin and wanted him to play it as well, but Severinsen wanted to play trombone. Because his arms were not long enough for trombone, and the small Arlington music store had none available, he settled for the cornet. A neighbor gave him some help on how to play, while his father, tobacco in mouth, instructed him to spit out the notes like spitting tobacco. His mother threatened to spank him if he didn't practice.

Severinsen proved to have a knack for the instrument, and was in a high school band when he was seven. At 9, he won a state trumpet contest, at 13, he joined a multi-state all-star band and, at 14, he auditioned for Tommy Dorsey but wasn't hired. He started a quartet called the Blue Notes that performed at local dances.

Before graduating from high school, he was hired to go on the road with the Ted Fio Rito Orchestra. After graduation, he went on tour with Charlie Barnet, Tommy Dorsey, and Benny Goodman. He served in the Army during World War II. Severinsen was a member of Sam Donahue's band between 1946-1951. In 1946, he played trumpet on radio station KODL.

The Tonight Show and other television appearances
In 1949, Severinsen landed a job as a studio musician for NBC, where he accompanied Steve Allen, Eddie Fisher, Dinah Shore, and Kate Smith, and was a member of the original band for Tonight Starring Steve Allen, and was the soloist playing the closing theme. He left the show with Allen in 1957. The leader of The Tonight Show Band, Skitch Henderson, asked him to return as first-chair trumpeter in 1962 for what had become The Tonight Show Starring Johnny Carson, and five years later Severinsen was leading the band.

Under Severinsen's direction, The Tonight Show Band, styled the NBC Orchestra, became perhaps the best known big band in America. Severinsen became one of the most popular bandleaders, appearing almost every night on television. He led the band during commercials and while guests were introduced. He joked with Johnny Carson, the show's host, and developed an amusing habit of wearing gaudy clothing.

The show introduced a comic "Stump the Band" segment in which audience members called out the titles of obscure songs to see if the band could play them. Severinsen often cried "key of E", his signal for the band to strike up a western theme, and then he would enthusiastically sing a country music-flavored nonsense song.

Severinsen substituted for Ed McMahon on occasions when Ed was absent as Carson's announcer and sidekick. He typically assumed this role when the show featured a guest host, which became increasingly frequent during the program's later years. Tommy Newsom was usually the band's substitute director when Severinsen was away from the show or filling in for McMahon. The sidekick role was omitted from the show when Leno guest hosted (it was discontinued altogether after Leno replaced Carson on a full-time basis). While Leno guest hosted for Carson, Severinsen typically introduced the guest host and led the band while interacting with Leno in a similar manner to his interactions with Carson and McMahon.

He continued as bandleader until Carson's retirement in 1992. Doc, along with Tommy Newsom and Ed Shaughnessy appeared in 31 January 2005 episode of Late Show with David Letterman performing Here's That Rainy Day in honor of Johnny Carson who passed away in 23 January the same year. He appeared on Jimmy Fallon's Tonight Show in February 2015 when the show traveled to Los Angeles for a week. He played for the evening with The Roots. The appearance helped to promote his nationwide tour.

Through the 1970s to the 1990s Severinsen also made appearances on Rowan & Martin's Laugh-In, Bonanza, The Bionic Woman, Cheers and The Larry Sanders Show, among others.

Recording career
During the early 1960s, Severinsen began recording big band albums, then moved toward instrumental pop music by the end of the decade. In the 1970s he recorded jazz funk, then disco, finding hits with "Night Journey" and "I Wanna Be With You". He released an album with the jazz fusion group Xebron in 1985. During the next year, he recorded The Tonight Show Band with Doc Severinsen which won the Grammy Award for Best Large Jazz Ensemble Performance. After Carson retired in 1992, he toured with some of the band's members, including Conte Candoli, Snooky Young, Bill Perkins, Ernie Watts, Ross Tompkins, and Ed Shaughnessy.

Severinsen performed with high school bands, in particular in the 1970s with Don Caneva's John Hersey High School Bands, which recorded four albums.

He performed the "Star-Spangled Banner" on at least three nationally telecast occasions; however, the first two renditions were marred by problems. When he accompanied actor Pat O'Brien, as O'Brien recited the National Anthem at Super Bowl IV, the public address system at Tulane Stadium went dead for a minute, although viewers were unaware of it. Fifteen years later, when he performed the anthem again prior to the Marvin Hagler vs. Thomas Hearns fight, a giant US flag on the side of the Fantasy Tower at Caesar's Palace overlooking the outdoor ring was not unfurled properly due to problems with the roping. He performed the anthem again, as well as "O Canada", at the 1989 Major League Baseball All-Star Game in Anaheim, California. With the game being played in the Los Angeles television and radio market, he was accompanied by the Tonight Show band. As of 2020, Severinsen and the NBC Orchestra's performance remains the most recent non-vocal rendition of the national anthem at the Midsummer Classic.

Severinsen is credited for co-writing the hit song "Stop and Smell the Roses" with Mac Davis, although both parties agree that Severinsen only came up with the title.

Conducting and teaching

Severinsen was the principal pops conductor for several orchestras in the US during and after his time on The Tonight Show. His first position was with the Phoenix Symphony in 1983. He then held similar positions with the Buffalo Philharmonic Orchestra, Milwaukee Symphony Orchestra, and Minnesota Orchestra.

He retired from conducting in 2007 and was named Pops Conductor Emeritus in Milwaukee and Pops Conductor Laureate in Minnesota. Severinsen was also named distinguished visiting professor of music and Katherine K. Herberger Heritage Chair for Visiting Artists at Arizona State University School of Music in 2001 and 2002.

In 2014, he was inducted into the Scandinavian-American Hall of Fame.

Severinsen performed his final concert, accompanied by his San Miguel 5 group, on September 1, 2022, in Saratoga Springs, New York.

Personal life

Severinsen's children are Nancy, Cindy, Allen, Robin, and Judy. He has eight grandchildren, including Blaire and Gray Reinhard, who write and perform roots rock music together in various incarnations as Curtis & Reinhard and the Blaire Reinhard Band. Severinsen has been quoted as saying that he has been married four times. His third wife, Emily Marshall, was a television writer and producer, and is an on-camera subject in a PBS documentary produced by American Masters titled, Never Too Late: The Doc Severinsen Story, that premiered April 2, 2021. They met when she was working as a secretary for The Tonight Show producer Fred de Cordova. His current partner, Cathy Leach, is a professor emerita of trumpet at the University of Tennessee.

Discography
 A String of Trumpets (Everest, 1960) with Billy Mure
 Tempestuous Trumpet (Command, 1961)
 The Big Band's Back in Town (Command, 1962)
 Torch Songs for Trumpet (Command, 1963)
 High, Wide & Wonderful (Command, 1965)
 Fever! (Command, 1966) (Pop No. 147)
 Command Performances (Command, 1966) (Pop No. 133)
 Live!: The Doc Severinsen Sextet (Command, 1967)
 Swinging & Singing (Command, 1967)
 The New Sound of Today's Big Band (Command, 1967)
 The Great Arrival (Command, 1968)
 Doc Severinsen & Strings (Command, 1968)
 Doc Severinsen's Closet (Command, 1970)
 Brass Roots (RCA Victor, 1971) (Pop No. 185)
 Brass on Ivory (RCA Victor, 1972) (Pop No. 74) with Henry Mancini
 Doc (RCA Victor, 1972)
 Brass, Ivory & Strings (RCA Victor, 1973) (Pop No. 185) with Henry Mancini
 Rhapsody for Now! (RCA Victor, 1973)
 Trumpets & Crumpets & Things (ABC, 1973)
 Night Journey (Epic, 1976) (Pop No. 189)
 Brand New Thing (Epic, 1977)
 Live from Beautiful Downtown Burbank Tommy Newsom Featuring Doc Severinsen (Direct Disk Labs, 1978)
 Doc Severinsen and Friends (Everest, 1978)
 London Sessions (Firstline, 1980)
 Seductive Strings Featuring Doc Severinsen (Bainbridge, 1980)
Doc Severinsen Plays Modern Trumpet Concertos (Firstline, 1981)
 And Xebron (Passport, 1985)
 Episodes (Pro-Arte, 1986)
 Ja-Da (MCA, 1986)
 The Tonight Show Band with Doc Severinsen (Amherst, 1986) (Pop No. 65)
 The Tonight Show Band with Doc Severinsen, Vol. II (Amherst, 1988)
 Facets (Amherst, 1988)
 The Big Band Hit Parade (Telarc, 1989)
 Trumpet Spectacular (Telarc, 1990)
 Once More...With Feeling! (Amherst, 1991)
 Merry Christmas from Doc Severinsen and The Tonight Show Orchestra (Amherst, 1991) (Pop No. 171)
 Unforgettably Doc (Telarc, 1992)
 Good Medicine (Bluebird/RCA, 1992)
 Lullabies and Goodnight (Critique, 1992)
 Two Sides of Doc Severinsen (The Right Stuff, 1993)
 Swingin' the Blues (Azica, 1999)
 El Ritmo De La Vida (Tejate, 2009) with Gil Gutierrez and Pedro Cartas
 En Mi Corazon (Tejate, 2010) with Gil Gutierrez and Pedro Cartas
 From the Archives (Essential Media Group, 2012)
 Oblivion (CD Baby, 2014)

As sideman
With Chris Connor
 1959 Witchcraft
 1961 Chris Connor Sings the George Gershwin Almanac of Song

With Urbie Green
 1956 All About Urbie Green and His Big Band (ABC-Paramount)
 1958 Let's Face the Music and Dance
 1960 The Persuasive Trombone of Urbie Green
 1963 Urbie Green & His Sextet

With Skitch Henderson and "The Tonight Show" Orchestra
 1964 Skitch...Tonight! 
 1965 More Skitch Tonight! 

With Gerry Mulligan
 1961 Gerry Mulligan Presents a Concert in Jazz 
 1963 Gerry Mulligan '63

With Tito Puente
 1957 Night Beat
 1957 Top Percussion
 1960 Tambó

With others
 1956 The Swingin' Miss "D", Dinah Washington
 1957 Dinah Washington Sings, Fats Waller
 1957 Stormy Weather, Lena Horne
 1958 Steve Allen at the Roundtable, Steve Allen
 1958 United Nations, Toshiko Akiyoshi
 1959 Late Date with Ruth Brown, Ruth Brown
 1959 More Charlie Barnet, Charlie Barnet
 1959 New York, N.Y., George Russell
 1959 Plays Gerry Mulligan Arrangements, Gene Krupa
 1961 Gloomy Sunday and Other Bright Moments, Bob Brookmeyer
 1961 The Jazz Version of "How to Succeed in Business without Really Trying", Gary McFarland
 1961 Into the Hot, Gil Evans
 1961 Memories Are Made of This, Ray Conniff
 1961 Perceptions, Dizzy Gillespie
 1962 Bashin': The Unpredictable Jimmy Smith, Jimmy Smith
 1962 All the Sad Young Men, Anita O'Day
 1962 Big Bags (Riverside, 1962), Milt Jackson
 1962 Big Band Bossa Nova, Stan Getz
 1962 Big Noise from Winnetka, Bob Haggart
 1962 It's About Time, Joe Morello
 1962 Joe Morello, Joe Morello
 1962 Off Beat Percussion, Don Lamond
 1962 Spanish Guitar, Tony Mottola
 1962 Vibrations, Enoch Light
 1963 Right Here, Right Now, Billy Taylor
 1964 Dimension "3", Enoch Light
 1974 The Hi-De-Ho Man, Cab Calloway
 1987 Jazz, Tony Bennett
 1988 Big Band Hit Parade, Erich Kunzel
 1989 Swinging West, Steve Lawrence
 1994 Eartha-quake, Eartha Kitt
 1994 Loose Walk, Sonny Stitt
 1997 Jammin' with Ben Webster, Ben Webster
 1999 Some Cats Know, Connie Evingson

References

External links

 
 Jazz at the Spa interview (audio)
 Interview with Doc Severinsen NAMM Oral History Library
 
 Doc Severinsen recordings at the Discography of American Historical Recordings.

1927 births
Living people
People from Gilliam County, Oregon
American jazz bandleaders
American jazz trumpeters
American male trumpeters
United States Army personnel of World War II
Arizona State University alumni
Bebop trumpeters
Big band bandleaders
Grammy Award winners
Military personnel from Oregon
Swing trumpeters
American people of Danish descent
The Tonight Show Band members
Distinguished Service to Music Medal recipients
United States Army soldiers
Musicians from Oregon
21st-century trumpeters
21st-century American male musicians
American male jazz musicians